"Gold" (often stylized as "GOLD") is the 15th single by the Japanese rock band Uverworld. It was released on March 31, 2010. The second track of the single, "Change" is set to be the image song of the upcoming Mobile Suit Gundam 00 movie adaptation. Both regular and limited pressings include a Mobile Suit Gundam 00 illustration-wide cap sticker.

Sony Music Entertainment Japan has finished producing a 3-D version of the title track's music video. The company will be giving out 1,000 tickets to fans for a screening of the music video on April 17, 2010.

Track listing

References

2010 singles
2010 songs
Uverworld songs
Gr8! Records singles